Kieran James Charnock (born 3 August 1984) is an English footballer who plays as a defender.

Career
Born in Preston, Lancashire, Charnock began his career at Wigan Athletic, coming through the club's youth system. However, he failed to establish himself in the squad and was sent out on loan to Southport. Charnock was released by Wigan quickly moving on to Football Conference side Northwich Victoria. He became an important part of the team forming a partnership with Mark Roberts and was chosen for the England non-League team.

At the end of the 2006–07 season Charnock requested a transfer away from Northwich Victoria in search of league football and was sold to Peterborough United for an undisclosed fee. Following a successful loan in the 2008–09 season with Accrington Stanley, he moved to Torquay United at the start of the subsequent season.

In November 2010, he joined Morecambe on an emergency six-week loan.

On 1 August 2012, Charnock joined Football Conference side Macclesfield Town on loan until January 2013. It was announced on 7 May 2013, that Fleetwood would not be offering the defender a new contract, and would therefore be released. On 3 June 2013, it was announced that Charnock had signed for Stockport County, with whom he had spent a loan spell with at the end of the 2012/2013 season.

In 2018, Charnock signed for Bamber Bridge after being released by Chorley.

Personal life
Charnock studied at the University of Salford for a degree in Physiotherapy, graduating in 2015 with first class honours.

Career statistics

References

External links

1984 births
Living people
Footballers from Preston, Lancashire
English footballers
England semi-pro international footballers
Association football defenders
Wigan Athletic F.C. players
Southport F.C. players
Northwich Victoria F.C. players
Peterborough United F.C. players
Accrington Stanley F.C. players
Torquay United F.C. players
Morecambe F.C. players
Fleetwood Town F.C. players
Macclesfield Town F.C. players
Stockport County F.C. players
Chester F.C. players
Chorley F.C. players
English Football League players
National League (English football) players
Alumni of the University of Salford